Nataša Krsmanović (born 19 June 1985) is a Serbian volleyball player, who plays as a middle-blocker for Seramiksan in Turkish Women's Volleyball League. She was a member of the national teams that won the silver medal at the 2007 European Championship and competed at the 2008 and 2012 Summer Olympics.

Career
Krsmanović lost the final game at the 2010–11 CEV Champions League Final Four with her team Rabita Baku, finishing as runner-up.

Krsmanović won the silver medal in the 2012 FIVB Club World Championship, playing with the Azerbaijani club Rabita Baku.

Krsmanović club, Rabita Baku won the bronze medal of the 2013–14 CEV Champions League after falling 0–3 to the Russian Dinamo Kazan in the semifinals, but defeating the Turkish Eczacıbaşı VitrA Istanbul 3–0 in the third place match.

Awards

Individuals
 2012–13 CEV Champions League "Best Blocker"

Clubs
 2011 FIVB Club World Championship –  Champion, with Rabita Baku
 2010–11 CEV Champions League –  Runner-Up, with Rabita Baku
 2012 FIVB Club World Championship –  Runner-Up, with Rabita Baku
 2012–13 CEV Champions League –  Runner-Up, with Rabita Baku
 2013–14 CEV Champions League –  Bronze medal, with Rabita Baku
 2017–18 CEV Champions League –  Runner-Up, with CSM Volei Alba Blaj

References

External links
 FIVB profile

1985 births
Sportspeople from Užice
Living people
Serbian women's volleyball players
Galatasaray S.K. (women's volleyball) players
Olympic volleyball players of Serbia
Volleyball players at the 2008 Summer Olympics
Volleyball players at the 2012 Summer Olympics
European champions for Serbia
Universiade medalists in volleyball
Serbian expatriate sportspeople in Switzerland
Serbian expatriate sportspeople in Turkey
Serbian expatriate sportspeople in Azerbaijan
Serbian expatriate sportspeople in China
Serbian expatriate sportspeople in Italy
Serbian expatriate sportspeople in Romania
Expatriate volleyball players in Romania
Universiade silver medalists for Serbia
Medalists at the 2009 Summer Universiade